Clare Mallory is the pen name under which Winifred Constance McQuilkan Hall (25 September 1913 – 20 April 1991) wrote ten children's books published between 1947 and 1951.

Clare Mallory is primarily remembered as a superior exponent of the girls' school story. Prior to her marriage she was headmistress of a day and boarding school in Dunedin, New Zealand and in her short autobiography published in Hugh Anderson's The Singing Roads (Wentworth Press, 1965) she describes her first books as coming from stories she made up to entertain her students while they prepared food parcels for Britain.

Biography 
Clare Mallory was born in Invercargill, New Zealand in 1913. She attended Southland Girls' High School where she was dux, University of Otago in Dunedin where she studied English and Classics, graduating with an M.A., and Somerville College, Oxford, where she gained a First in English. She returned to New Zealand to teach, first at Otago Girls' High School and then as headmistress of Columba College, Dunedin in 1942. She left that position when she married Frank Hall in 1949. After her marriage the couple lived in London for a few years but came back to New Zealand in 1952, and Mallory lived there until her death in 1991.

Literary influences 

The Encyclopaedia of Girls' School Stories describes Mallory as 'one of the best exponents of the classical school story'(p. 211) She doesn't break new ground but rather stays true to the traditional elements of the genre, populating her stories with tall, authoritative Head Girls, forceful Games Captains, respected albeit distant Head Mistresses and a cast of likeable juniors of assorted ages. If there is a recurring theme to her stories it is the importance of belonging. Mallory's parents died whilst she was a teenager, and she completed her schooling while living in lodgings. Mallory's heroes relish the ties that bind. Merry is 'second generation Tremaynes', Juliet travels 12,000 miles to attend the school her grandfather helped found, Leith thinks she is looking for a particular friend but discovers instead the value of belonging to a community.

Mallory dedicated Juliet Overseas to Josephine Elder, author of what she described as 'the best school story I know'. Her admiration for Elder's book Evelyn Finds Herself was later reflected in Leith and Friends in which she uses a similar framework to explore the same themes of friendship and self-discovery. In The Singing Roads, Mallory identifies Leith and Friends as having been 'hailed in England as the best school story for many years'(p. 60). Elder's influence on Mallory's writing can also be seen in The League of the Smallest which is thematically linked to Elder's 1927 school story Thomasina Toddy.

Brenda Page was another influence on Mallory's writing. Page's 1927 school story Schoolgirl Rivals is obviously Mallory's inspirational source for Juliet Overseas. In the early chapters the similarities between the two books are particularly apparent with sentences being transposed with slight or no alteration; she was a stranger in a strange land becomes She was a new girl in a strange land; a crowd of passengers from another train swarmed across the platform becomes a little crowd of passengers from another train hurried across the platform. As the stories progress however Mallory strikes off firmly on her own taking her story to a level of excellence in characterisation and plotting that far surpasses the earlier book.

Bibliography 
"Merry" series
 Merry Begins (OUP, 1947)
 Merry Again (OUP, 1947; republished by Girls Gone By in 2005)
 Merry Marches On (OUP, 1947)

N.B. At the end of Merry Marches On there is a note citing a fourth book Tremaynes Trans Tasman as being in preparation. In her article in The Singing Roads, Mallory states that she has renamed this book Merry In Australia and is working on it. In fact, no book of either title was ever published. Someone who worked at the Melbourne office of OUP still recalled fifty years later how frequently they received queries from the public about it.
 The Pen and Pencil Girls (OUP, 1948?)
 Juliet Overseas (OUP, 1949)
 The New House at Winwood (OUP, 1949)
 Tony Against the Prefects (OUP, 1949)
 Leith and Friends (OUP, 1950)
 The Two Linties (OUP, 1950)
 The League of the Smallest (OUP, 1951)

References

Further reading

 The Singing Roads / Hugh Anderson (Wentworth Press, 1965)
 The Encyclopaedia of Girls' School Stories / Sue Sims and Hilary Clare (Ashgate, 2000)
 Schoolgirl Rivals / Brenda Page (Cassell, 1927)

External links

  (none, March 2016)

1913 births
1991 deaths
New Zealand children's writers
University of Otago alumni
20th-century New Zealand novelists
People educated at Southland Girls' High School
New Zealand women novelists
New Zealand women children's writers
Alumni of Somerville College, Oxford
20th-century New Zealand women writers
People from Invercargill
20th-century New Zealand educators